Rhaphidophora korthalsii is a flowering plant of species Rhaphidophora the family Araceae.

Description

Stem 
R. korthalsii is a very large, robust pachycaul, heterophyllous liana to 20 meters in its seedling stage as a non-skototropic, "shingling" juvenile shoot. "Shingling" refers to the orientation of the leaves to match the contours of the substrate.  The adult shoot is composed of elongated, "clingy", leafy flowing stems.

Inflorescence 
Solitary or several together, the first inflorescence is subtended by a bract and one or more cataphylls, which degrade into netted fibres following the emergence of inflorescences subtended by one or more cataphylls.

Infructescence 
The infructescences are 14-27 x 3-3.5 cm.   When unripe they are a dark green which will ripen into a dull orange colour.

Distribution 
Rhaphidophora korthalsii is native to Arunachal Pradesh, South Nansei-shoto, peninsular Thailand to Malesia and the western Pacific region.

References

korthalsii